Josef Jáchym Redelmayer (20 April 1727 - 13 February 1788) was a Czech painter, fresco painter and theater decorator during the late Rococo period.

Life
Born in Prague, as a seventeen-year-old Redelmayer began painting decorations for the Prague Theatre. For his talent and hard work he gained the favor of a local painter; he studied with him and became one of his best pupils. He was influenced by the decorative style of the Berlin painter G. Galli-Bibiena. He created paintings for the refectory in Doksany (before 1760). Redelmayer worked for the monastery until the Josephinian interference. He died on 13 February 1788 in Prague.

Works
Only a few works of his are known to have survived. He is known for a painting of St. Libor in Prague with the Charles Brothers of Charity (1771), and frescoes in the church. He also worked together with Joseph Hager to decorate the hall and chapel in the castle of Bečvář (1774), and the frescoes in the Church of Our Lady in Prague Auxiliary Sanders (together with Fr. Ant. Balk).

References

Czech painters
Czech male painters
1727 births
1788 deaths
Artists from Prague